Robert Rogers  was an Anglican priest and Antiquary  in the second half of the 16th-century.

Rogers was educated at Christ Church, Oxford.
He was appointed Archdeacon of Chester in 1566  and Canon of Chester Cathedral in 1580, holding both positions unil his death in 1595.

References

1595 deaths
Archdeacons of Chester
16th-century English people
Alumni of Christ Church, Oxford